Begumpet ("Begum's Place") is an upscale locality of  Secunderabad, Hyderabad, Telangana, India. Begumpet is named after the daughter of the sixth Nizam (Mahbub Ali Khan, Asaf Jah VI), Basheer Unnisa Begum, who received it as part of her wedding dowry when she was married to the second Amir of Paigah Shams ul Umra Amir e Kabir.

About

Begumpet is one of the major commercial and residential urbs in Hyderabad located to the north of Hussain Sagar lake. The Greenlands flyover connects Begumpet to Panjagutta. Begumpet was initially a small suburb between Hyderabad and Secunderabad.  Begumpet was the most impacted in 2000 Hyderabad floods after a deluge of 241.5 mm was recorded on August 24, 2000.

Begumpet Airport is a major landmark of the city. The airport is closed for commercial flights after the inauguration of the new international airport at Shamshabad and is operational only for training and chartered flights.

Paigah Palace, Gitanjali Senior School, Begumpet Spanish Mosque, Hyderabad Public School and Sir Ronald Ross Institute are some important places located in the area. Sanjeevaiah Park is a public park located on the banks of Hussain Sagar. The Greenlands area of the town was home to Raja Jitendra Public School until 1997.

Hospitals
 Pace Hospitals
 Maxivision Eye Hospitals

Transport
Begumpet Railway Station provides rail connectivity to the area. Other MMTS stations in the vicinity include Sanjeevaiah Park and James Street. State-owned TSRTC runs the city bus service, connecting Begumpet to major parts of the city. The metro rail has also started and is now one of the most popular means of transport to students as well as other citizens. Begumpet metro station serves this area.

References

External links 

Neighbourhoods in Hyderabad, India
Shopping districts and streets in India